Maxime Pauty (born 20 June 1993) is a French right-handed foil fencer, 2019 team European champion, and 2021 team Olympic champion.

Medal Record

Olympic Games

World Championship

European Championship

World Cup

References

External links

1993 births
Living people
French male foil fencers
European Games competitors for France
Fencers at the 2015 European Games
World Fencing Championships medalists
Olympic fencers of France
Olympic medalists in fencing
Fencers at the 2020 Summer Olympics
Medalists at the 2020 Summer Olympics
Olympic gold medalists for France